Green Bay High School may refer to one of the following schools:

New Zealand
Green Bay High School, Auckland, a secondary school in the Auckland suburb of Green Bay

United States
Green Bay East High School, a public school that serves the east side of Green Bay, Wisconsin
Green Bay Southwest High School, a public school that serves the Green Bay, Wisconsin area
Green Bay West High School, a public school that serves the west side of Green Bay, Wisconsin

See also
Bay High School (disambiguation)